Wuchang railway station is a railway station of Lafa–Harbin Railway located in Wuchang, Harbin, Heilongjiang province, China.

See also
Lafa–Harbin Railway

References

Railway stations in Heilongjiang
Railway stations in Harbin